The nuragic sanctuary of Gremanu is a sacred nuragic area located in the territory of Fonni, in the province of Nuoro.

The site, dating back to the late Bronze Age and located at more than 1000 m altitude, is made up of a stone huts village and several sacred buildings enclosed in a rectangular enclosure devoted to the cult of the waters, including a megaron temple and a particular circular temple.
The sanctuary is refurnished by an aqueduct, the only known example of a Nuragic aqueduct.
The settlement covers more than 7 hectares.

External links
Sardegnacultura, Fonni, Santuario di Gremanu
Il Portale Sardo, SANTUARIO NURAGICO GREMANU - FONNI

Archaeological sites in Sardinia